Sengupathi Falls are situated  from Coimbatore city
on the Coimbatore - Siruvani Road.

Other interesting projects/places nearby are Parambikulam, Aliyar, Sholiyar, Palar rivers and Anaimalai Hills range. Siruvani Waterfalls is not too far from this place.

Waterfalls of Tamil Nadu
Geography of Coimbatore